was a village located in Ena District, Gifu Prefecture, Japan.

As of 2003, the village had an estimated population of 976 and a density of 25.54 persons per km2. The total area was 38.22 km2.

On October 25, 2004, Kushihara, along with the towns of Akechi, Iwamura, Kamiyahagi and Yamaoka (all from Ena District), was merged into the expanded city of Ena, and no longer exists as an independent municipality.

Notes

External links
 Official website of Ena 

Dissolved municipalities of Gifu Prefecture
Populated places disestablished in 2004
Ena, Gifu
2004 disestablishments in Japan